Yan Shu (991 – 1055) was a Chinese calligrapher, essayist, poet, and politician of the Song dynasty. He was given the posthumous title of Yuanxian as well as bestowed the title of Duke of Linzi.

Yan Shu was born in modern-day Linchuan District of Fuzhou, Jiangxi. He was considered to be a child prodigy and at the age of 14, passed the imperial examinations. During his lifetime, Yan Shu had composed over 10,000 Ci poems, but most have been lost. Of the remaining, the Pearl Jade, of which 136 poems remain, is considered to be one of his most notable works. Other major works in existence today include parts of 《晏元獻遺文》 and 《類要》. Together with Ouyang Xiu, they were referred to as "Yan-Ou".

He was a scholar of the Hanlin Academy, one of the initiators of the Qingli Reforms and served as prime minister to Emperor Renzong.

Early life

Yan Shu was able to compose poems by the age of five and when he was fourteen, he passed the imperial examinations with ease after competing with over a thousand other scholars across the kingdom. During the Ci poem essay composition part of the examination, he informed the examiner that he had previously already worked the problem being asked, and if whether there were any other problems he can do instead. Emperor Zhenzong praised him and bestowed upon him the title of Tong Jin Shi. The then prime minister Kou Zhun expressed that Yan Shu was an outsider from which Emperor Zong replied: “Was not Zhang Jiuling also an outsider at the time?”

Beginnings of Officialdom

Starting from 1008, Yan Shu served as an assistant to a Guanglushi official and was tasked to edit imperial decrees. He later became an assistant to the Ministry of Ceremonies (Han dynasty) and promoted to become a keeper of the imperial seal. After ascension to becoming an entry-level official of the Hu Bu (Ministry of Revenue), he became a close confidant to the crown prince. He also became a scholar of the Hanlin Academy.

References

991 births
1055 deaths
11th-century Chinese calligraphers
11th-century Chinese poets
Artists from Fuzhou
Poets from Jiangxi
Politicians from Fuzhou, Jiangxi
Song dynasty calligraphers
Song dynasty essayists
Song dynasty poets
Song dynasty politicians from Jiangxi